Thirty-six Views of Mount Fuji is a series of woodblock prints by Hokusai.

Thirty-six Views of Mount Fuji may also refer to:
Thirty-six Views of Mount Fuji (Hiroshige), a series of woodblock prints by Hiroshige
Thirty-Six Views of Mount Fuji: On Finding Myself in Japan, a 1993 memoir by Cathy N. Davidson